The 1932–33 British Home Championship was a football tournament played between the British Home Nations during the 1932–33 season. It was won by the strong Welsh side which claimed several tournaments during the 1930s, the last undisputed victories Wales would achieve.

The tournament began with victories by both Scotland and England over Ireland, who endured a miserable competition, losing all their games and conceding nine goals. Scotland in particular began well with a 4–0 victory in Belfast. Scotland were however in for a shock in their second game in Edinburgh as they were demolished by a commanding Welsh display, losing 5–2. England by contrast managed to hold the Welsh to a scoreless draw in Wrexham and England and Wales emerged as favourites going into the final matches. Wales maintained their strong run of form, by crushing Ireland 4–1 in their final game, requiring England to beat Scotland in Glasgow to draw for the trophy. This effort proved too much for England, who went down 2–1 to the Scots, who took second place.

Table

Results

References

 British Home Championship 1919-20 to 1938-1939  - dates, results, tables and top scorers at RSSSF

1932–33 in English football
1932–33 in Scottish football
Brit
1933 in British sport
1931-32
1932–33 in Northern Ireland association football